Majed Al-Marhoum (born May 21, 1982) is a Saudi football player who plays as a midfielder.

References

1982 births
Living people
Saudi Arabian footballers
Al-Shoulla FC players
Al-Kawkab FC players
Al-Shabab FC (Riyadh) players
Al-Hazem F.C. players
Al-Fayha FC players
Al-Selmiyah Club players
Place of birth missing (living people)
Association football midfielders
Saudi Professional League players
Saudi First Division League players
Saudi Second Division players
Saudi Fourth Division players